The 2012 Mnet Asian Music Awards took place on November 30, 2012, at Hong Kong Convention and Exhibition Centre in Hong Kong. The ceremony was the third consecutive Mnet Asian Music Awards to occur outside of South Korea. It was reported by international news agencies such as Agence France-Presse, ITN, and was also broadcast in 85 countries around the world.

Leading the nominees was Psy with six nominations. By the end of the ceremony, Psy had won four awards, the most of any of the nominees, followed by boybands BigBang and Busker Busker with two each, excluding the special awards.

Background
The event marked the fourteenth of the annual music awards. Using its slogan "Music Makes One" for the second consecutive time, MAMA was broadcast live in China, Japan, Hong Kong and Southeast Asia through various channels, as well as in the US and Canada.

During the Red Carpet, artists B.A.P, Davichi,  Mike Izon and Block B performed their songs "No Mercy", "Crash", "I'll Think of You", "Don't Say Goodbye", "Set Fire to the Rain" and "Nillili Mambo" respectively. International artists were seen with their greetings on screen during the main event including Dr. Dre and Jackie Chan

Performers 
The following individuals and groups, listed in order of appearance, performed musical numbers at the ceremony.

Presenters

 Song Joong-ki – welcome address
 Choi Minho and Jung Eun-ji – presented Best New Female Artist
 Simon Yam – presented Best Dance Performance - Solo
 Han Ga-in – presented Best Male Group
 Kim Kang-woo – Best Female Group
 Jung Il-woo – introduced performer Wang Leehom and presented the Overall Best Asian Artist
 Jung Gyu-woon and Chae Yeon – presented Best Collaboration Performance and Mnet PD's Choice
 Huang Tsz Ting – introduced performers Epik High ft. Lee Hi
 Jung Il-woo and Jo Yoon-hee – presented Best Dance Performance - Male Group and Female Group
 Han Chae-young – introduced performer Roy Kim
 Kim Sung-soo and Go Joon-hee – presented Best Vocal Performance - Solo and Group
 Krystal Jung – introduced performer Adam Lambert
 Kim Hyo-jin – presented International Favorite Artist
 Peng Yuyan and Bai Baihe – presented Best OST
 Han Ye-seul – introduced performers SHINee and EXO
 Han Chae-young – presented Best Music Video
 Victoria Song – presented TVB Choice Award
 Kim Hyo-jin – introduced performer Li Yuchun
 Park Shin-hye and Yoon Shi-yoon – presented Best New Asian Group
 Jung Suk-won and Yun-gil Jeong – presented Best Style in Music
 Angelababy – presented Guardian Angel Worldwide Performer
 Danny (대니) – Guest host - Introduced Hip-hop performers
 Shin Bora and Ailee – presented Best Rap Performance
 Bolin Chen – presented Best Male Artist
 Choi Ji-woo – presented Best Line Award, introduced performers Big Bang
 Song Seung-heon – presented Best Global Group
 Song Joong-ki – introduced performer Psy
 Yoo Seung-jun, Helen Yao and Zhang Lanxin – Introduced the three grand awards through the movie CZ12
 Jackie Chan and Han Ye-seul – presented Artist of the Year
 Song Seung-heon and Han Ga-in – presented Album of the Year
 Choi Ji-woo and Jung Woo-sung – presented Song of the Year
 Song Joong-ki – Closing remarks

Winners and nominees

Winners are listed first and highlighted in boldface.

Special Awards
 Mnet PD's Choice: BAP
 Overall Best Asian Artist: Wang Leehom
 Asian Artist Award:
AKB48
Sarah Geronimo
My Tam
Taufik Batisah
Agnes Monica
Chris Lee (Li Yuchun)
 Best New Asian Group:
EXO
TimeZ
Natthew
 TVB Choice Award: Joey Yung
 Best Style in Music: Son Ga-in
 Guardian Angel Worldwide Performer: Big Bang
 Best Line Award: Super Junior

Multiple awards

Artist(s) with multiple wins
The following artist(s) received two or more wins (excluding the special awards):

Artist(s) with multiple nominations
The following artist(s) received two or more nominations:

Broadcast

Notes

References

MAMA Awards ceremonies
2012 in South Korean music
2012 in Hong Kong
2012 music awards